Nicholas David Hammond (born 7 September 1967 in Hornchurch, England) is an English former football goalkeeper.

Playing career
Hammond was an Arsenal apprentice, making his league début whilst on loan at Bristol Rovers in 1986, followed by further loan spells at Peterborough United and Aberdeen.

Hammond joined Swindon Town on a free transfer in July 1987, and while there he twice broke his leg which resulted in him taking the number 23 shirt for the 1993–94 Premier League campaign, rather than the unlucky number 13. He was one of four goalkeepers used by Swindon throughout that season alongside Fraser Digby, Jon Sheffield and Paul Heald.

A short spell at Plymouth Argyle culminated in a loan to Reading in December 1995, with the move being made permanent for £40,000 a month later. A highly regarded goalkeeping coach, Hammond was handed a coaching role by Alan Pardew and he subsequently retired from playing after suffering a recurrent back injury.

Coaching career
In October 2000, Hammond took over from John Stephenson to become Reading's Youth Academy Director, and was appointed the Club's first-ever Director of Football in September 2003.

In April 2016, Hammond ended his 20-year association with Reading to become Technical Director at West Bromwich Albion. In June 2019, Scottish Premiership club Celtic appointed Hammond to a recruitment consultancy role. Celtic then named him as their head of football operations in October 2019.

In December 2021, Hammond was appointed as an interim transfer consultant by Newcastle United.

References

External links

Living people
1967 births
Footballers from Hornchurch
Association football goalkeepers
English footballers
Arsenal F.C. players
Bristol Rovers F.C. players
Peterborough United F.C. players
Swindon Town F.C. players
Plymouth Argyle F.C. players
Reading F.C. players
Premier League players
English Football League players
Reading F.C. non-playing staff
West Bromwich Albion F.C. non-playing staff
Celtic F.C. non-playing staff
Newcastle United F.C. non-playing staff